Boban Vasov (born 9 January 1986 in Dimitrovgrad) is a Serbian football player who plays for Austrian club FC Großklein.

Club career

Serbia
In 2001, Radnički Pirot youth had a friendly game against Levski Sofia youth team, on which the scouts of the Sofia side spotted him and after a short trial period in Sofia, they decided to transfer him to their football academy.

Bulgaria
He started the 2001–02 season with Levski Sofia, playing as a central defender. Later the season, thanks to the good performances, he was selected to play both 1985 and 1986 youth teams. In 2002, Levski youth team wins a double by winning the Championship and the National Cup. Two years later, his team finished at the third place in the Championship and have won the National cup. 
After playing his last game for the youth squad he started to train with the senior team of Levski Sofia, but from the club decided to send him on loan to Marek Dupnitsa.

Back to Serbia
In January 2008 he returned to his hometown Dimitrovgrad to spend a year and a half at Balkanski . Here he plays a total of 40 games, scoring 5 goas. He catches the eye of the coach of his old club Radnički Pirot in the matches between the two teams in the league.
In the summer of 2009 he moved back to Radnički Pirot. For 3 seasons here, he plays 88 matches and scores 14 goals becoming one of the important players for the team. Putting down some great performances and by showing consistency in the games he catches the eye of the managers and soon after the end of the season in 2012 he transfers to the Bahrain side East Riffa Club.

Bahrain
In September 2012, he signed for East Riffa Club from Bahrain. With East Riffa Club he reaches the 2nd place in Second league and plays in the First league promotion Play-off. They have lost the play-off by losing the first leg away 1–0 to Malkiya Club and managing to draw 1–1 at home.

Celje
Boban Vasov has signed a contract with NK Celje on 31 January 2014.

FC Großklein
Vasov joined Austrian, FC Großklein, club in the summer 2017.

References

External links
PrvaLiga profile 

1986 births
Living people
Serbian footballers
Association football defenders
Serbian expatriate footballers
Expatriate footballers in Bulgaria
PFC Levski Sofia players
Expatriate footballers in Bahrain
Slovenian PrvaLiga players
Serbian expatriate sportspeople in Slovenia
Expatriate footballers in Slovenia
NK Celje players
People from Dimitrovgrad, Serbia